Following is a list of past and present Members of Parliament (MPs) of the United Kingdom whose surnames begin with Z.  The dates in parentheses are the periods for which they were MPs.  This list is complete for MPs since 1832.

Colour key:  

 Z